Hellenic Television may refer to:

Hellenic Broadcasting Corporation, Greek state broadcaster
New Hellenic Television, second television network of the Hellenic Broadcasting Corporation
Hellenic TV, a Greek-language television station based in the United Kingdom